Bluewater is a municipality located in Huron County, Ontario, which is part of Southwestern Ontario, Ontario, Canada. As of 2016, the municipality has a population of 7,136.

History
Bluewater was formed on January 1, 2001 when the Government of Ontario amalgamated the townships of Hay and Stanley with the villages of Bayfield, Hensall and Zurich.

Geography
Bluewater's western boundary is Lake Huron. Its northern boundary is the Bayfield River between Lake Huron and Clinton. Highway 4 is the eastern boundary, while Huron Road 83 and the Exeter urban boundary (in South Huron) form the southern boundary.

Communities
Bluewater includes the following communities:

 Hay Township: Blake (shared with Stanley Township), Dashwood, Hensall, Kippen (shared with Huron East)(and formerly shared between Hay, Stanley and Tuckersmith Townships), St. Joseph, Zurich, Hay, Hills Green, Johnson's Mills, Rodgerville, Sarepta
 Stanley Township: Bayfield, Brucefield (shared with Huron East), Kippen (shared with Huron East)(and formerly shared between Hay, Stanley and Tuckersmith Townships), Varna; Bannockburn, Dinsley Terrace, Drysdale, Goshen

Demographics 

Notable persons 
 William Aberhart- Premier of Alberta
 Ryan O'Reilly– Professional hockey player and Stanley Cup champion
 Babe Siebert- Professional hockey player

See also
List of townships in Ontario

References

External links 

Lower-tier municipalities in Ontario
Municipalities in Huron County, Ontario